Sherlock Holmes and the Baskerville Curse is a 1983 Australian animated television film directed by Eddie Graham. It is an adaptation of Sir Arthur Conan Doyle's novel The Hound of the Baskervilles (1901-1902), the third of his novels featuring Sherlock Holmes and Dr. John Watson.

Plot
The film tells us about Holmes' adventure on a legend of hound of Baskerville family.

Voice cast
Peter O'Toole as Sherlock Holmes
Earle Cross as Dr. James Watson
Additional voices are provided by Ron Haddrick, Helen Morse, Robin Stewart, Moya O'Sullivan and Phillip Hinton.

References

External links

Films based on The Hound of the Baskervilles
Australian television films
1983 television films
1983 films
Animated films based on British novels
Sherlock Holmes films
1980s Australian animated films
1980s English-language films